Nicola Cosentino (born 2 January 1959) is an Italian politician. He was until 1/21 the regional coordinator of Forza Italia (Silvio Berlusconi's party) in Campania.

Biography
Cosentino was born in Casal di Principe, one of Camorra's strongholds near Naples.  He is a distant relative of the Casalesi clan boss Giuseppe Russo.

Cosentino, a member of the Italian Socialist Democratic Party, was municipal counsellor  in 1978-1980, then provincial counsellor from 1980 to 1995. In that year he was elected into the Italian Chamber of Deputies for Forza Italia. In 2005 he ran for the Presidency of the Province of Caserta, but was defeated by the centre-left candidate Sandro De Franciscis. Cosentino was re-elected to the Chamber of Deputies in April 2008 for the Popolo della Libertà, Berlusconi's alliance. In September of  the same year, he was involved (through the confession of a camorra boss, Gaetano Vassallo of allowing illegal treatment of toxic wastes in exchange of a monthly sum of 50,000 Euros. In 2009 magistrates Naples' anti-mafia commission sent to the Chamber of Deputies the request of arrest for Cosentino, but the Chamber's commission refused.

In 2010  Cosentino was also involved in a scandal related to wind energy systems in Sardinia, which led to the discovery of the so-called nuova P2 or P3 ("new Propaganda 2", the latter being a secret masonic lodge of the 1970s-early 1980s, of which Berlusconi was a member). He was called in by several  entrepreneurs and Popolo della Libertà politicians. According to Rome's Tribunal, the accuses were:
pressuring the Constitutional court to consider as legitimate the Lodo Alfano (a law which would have saved then prime minister Berlusconi from several of his trials, and which was finally declared  invalid)
supporting the readmission of the regional list "Per la Lombardia" in the regional elections in Lombardy. The list had been banned due to use of fake signatures on the petitions that are required for a political party, or list of candidates to be placed on the ballot.
favouring the appointment of Alfonso Marra in the Court of Appeal in Milan
supporting the candidature of Cosentino as governor of Campania through a smear campaign against the other Popolo della Libertà's candidate.

On 14 July 2010, Cosentino resigned as undersecretary of the Italian Ministry of Economy, although he retained the role as regional coordinator of Popolo della Libertà in Campania.

References

External links
Page at Italy' Chamber of Deputies website 
"Siamo tutti casalesi", Page at L'espresso website about the accuses of camorra allegiance against Cosentino and the wastes scandal 
"Italian govt aide accused of Mafia collusion", page at euronews.net 

1959 births
Living people
People from the Province of Caserta
Italian Democratic Socialist Party politicians
Forza Italia politicians
The People of Freedom politicians
Forza Italia (2013) politicians
Deputies of Legislature XIII of Italy
Deputies of Legislature XIV of Italy
Deputies of Legislature XV of Italy
Deputies of Legislature XVI of Italy
Politicians of Campania